"Zulu" is a 1981 song by British duo The Quick. "Zulu" was their most successful of three singles the group placed on the dance chart.  The single went to number one for two weeks in October 1981. "Zulu" also peaked at number sixty on the R&B singles chart.

See also
List of number-one dance singles of 1981 (U.S.)

References

1981 singles
1981 songs
Epic Records singles